Mathias Huning (born 25 June 1969) is a former professional tennis player from Germany.

Career
Huning, a doubles specialist, competed in both the men's doubles (with Jon Ireland) and mixed doubles (with Debbie Graham) at the 1996 Wimbledon Championships. He lost in the opening round in each.

On the ATP Tour he wasn't able to reach a final but was a doubles semi-finalist three times, at Casablanca in 1994, Bastad in 1995 and Casablanca again in 1997. He won five ATP Challenger titles.

Challenger titles

Doubles: (5)

References

1969 births
Living people
German male tennis players
People from Mettmann
Sportspeople from Düsseldorf (region)
Tennis people from North Rhine-Westphalia